The Pacific spoon-nose eel (Echiophis brunneus, also known commonly as the Fangjaw eel in Mexico) is an eel in the family Ophichthidae (worm/snake eels). It was described by José Luis Castro-Aguirre and Sergio Suárez de los Cobos in 1983, originally under the genus Notophtophis. It is a marine, tropical eel which is known from the eastern central and southeastern Pacific Ocean, including the Gulf of California, Colombia, Mexico, Costa Rica, Nicaragua, Ecuador and Panama.

Due to its wide distribution, lack of known major threats, and lack of observed population decline, the IUCN redlist currently lists the Pacific spoon-nose eel as Least Concern. It is sometimes caught as by-catch by trawlers, but is usually discarded.

References

Ophichthidae
Fish described in 1983